Whitford is a surname. Notable people with the surname include: 

 Albert Whitford (astronomer) (1905–2002), American astronomer
 Albert Whitford (politician) (1877–1924), Australian politician
 Brad Whitford (born 1952), American musician
 Bradley Whitford (born 1959), American actor
 Peter Whitford (born 1939), Australian actor
 Philippa Whitford (born 1958), Scottish politician and surgeon
 Stanley Whitford (1878–1959), Australian politician
 Tony Whitford (born 1941), Canadian politician
 Walter Whitford (c. 1581 – 1647), Scottish minister, prelate and Royalist

See also 
 Whiteford (surname)
 Whitford (disambiguation)

Surnames of British Isles origin